Caitano Costa (born 27 October 1980) is an Indian professional footballer who plays as a defender for Salgaocar F.C. in the I-League on loan from Pune.

References

External links 
 

1980 births
Living people
Indian footballers
Pune FC players
Salgaocar FC players
Association football defenders
Footballers from Goa
I-League players
People from Margao